The Turkish order of precedence, the following is the list of Turkish order of precedence approved by the President of Turkey and administered by the Directorate of Protocols of the Ministry of Foreign Affairs.

This is a hierarchy of officials in the Turkish Republic used to direct protocol for domestic ceremonies, hence it does not involve any foreign dignitaries. It also does not contain the President of Turkey, since he is the head of the state and assumed to be at the top of the list naturally.

Turkish order of precedence list 
 Speaker of the Grand National Assembly
 Vice-president of Turkey
 President of the Constitutional Court
 Former presidents
First President of the Court of Cassation
President of the Council of State
 Ministers of the Government (in alphabetical order of ministry names)
Chief of the Turkish General Staff
 Commanders of the Turkish Armed Forces
 Generals/Admirals
President of the Council of Higher Education
 Leader of the Main Opposition Party
 Deputy Speaker of the Grand National Assembly
 Leaders of the political parties that have groups in the Parliament
 Clerk members and administrative members of the Parliament
 Leaders of the political parties that are represented in the Parliament
 Chairperson and Deputy Chairman's of the political party groups in the Parliament
 Deputy Chairpersons of the political parties that have groups in the Parliament
 General Secretaries of the political parties that have groups in the Parliament
 Members of the Parliament
President of the Court of Accounts
 Chief Public Prosecutor of the Court of Cassation
 President of the Turkish Bars Association
Chief Prosecutor of the Council of State
Deputy Presidents of the Constitutional Court
 President of the Court of Jurisdictional Disputes
 Justices of the Constitutional Court
 Deputy First Presidents of the Court of Cassation
Deputy President of the Council of State
 Deputy President of the Council of Judges and Prosecutors
 Deputy Chief Public Prosecutor of the Court of Cassation
 President of the Supreme Electoral Council
 President of the High Council of Arbitrators
 General secretary of the National Security Council
 President of the National Intelligence Organization
 President of the State Supervisory Council
 President of Strategy and Budget
 President of the Defense Industries
 President of the Directorate of Communications
 President of the Directorate of Religious Affairs
 President of the Directorate of State Archives
 President of the Directorate of National Palaces
 President of the Directorate of Presidential Administrative Affairs
 General Secretary of the Parliament
 Presidents of the Office of the Presidency
 Deputy ministers
 Chief Auditor of the Ombudsman Institution
 Governor of Ankara
 Rectors of universities in Ankara
 Commander of the Garrison of Ankara
 Mayor of Ankara Metropolitan Municipality
Deputy Presidents of the Policy Boards under the Presidency
 Members of the Council of Higher Education
 Lieutenant generals/Vice admirals
 President of the Atatürk High Institution of Culture, Language and History
 President of the Radio and Television Supreme Council
 President of the Turkish Academy of Sciences
 Governor of the Central Bank of the Republic of Turkey
 President of the Competition Authority
 President of the Privatization Administration
 Chairperson of the Capital Markets Board
Deputy General Secretaries of the Parliament
 Major generals/Rear admirals
 Court of Cassation of Department Heads and members
 Council of State of Department Heads and members
 Court of Accounts of Department Heads and members
 President of the Turkey Energy, Nuclear and Mining Research Institute
 President of the Scientific and Technological Research Council of Turkey
 Deputy Rectors of Universities in Ankara
 Members of the Supreme Electoral Council
 Members of the State Supervisory Council
 Auditors of the Ombudsman Institution
 Brigadier generals/Commodores
 General secretary of the Council of Higher Education
 President of the Turkish Statistical Institute
 General manager of the Anadolu Agency
 General manager of the Turkish Radio Television Corporation
 General manager of the Meteorology
 Director General of Foundations
 General Director of Land Deeds and Cadastral
 General Managers of the Ministry
 Deans and Deputy Deans of the faculties of the universities in Ankara
 Heads of Professional Organizations in the nature of public institutions in Ankara
 Heads of Civil and Military Associations

See also 
 Politics of Turkey
 Women in Turkish politics
 Order of precedence

References

Order of precedence
Turkey